The Expedition of Tabuk, also known as the Expedition of Usra, was a military expedition that was initiated by the Islamic prophet Muhammad in October 630 CE (AH 9). He led a force of as many as 30,000 north to Tabuk, near the Gulf of Aqaba, in present-day northwestern Saudi Arabia.

Preparations
Following rumours of a Byzantine invasion, the Muslims and allies of Muhammad received an urgent call to join the campaign, but the Arabs of the desert showed little interest. Many came up with excuses not to participate. Muhammad provided incentives to persuade the Arabs to join and provided many with gifts.

Expedition
Muhammad and his forces marched northwards to Tabuk, near the Gulf of Aqaba in October 630 (Rajab AH 9). It was his largest and last military expedition. Ali ibn Abi Talib, who participated in several other expeditions of Muhammad, did not participate in Muhammad's Tabuk expedition upon Muhammad's instructions, as he held command at Medina. After arriving at Tabuk and camping there, Muhammad's army prepared to face the Byzantine invasion. Muhammad spent twenty days at Tabuk, scouting the area, making alliances with local chiefs. With no sign of the Byzantine army, he decided to return to Medina. Though Muhammad did not encounter a Byzantine army at Tabuk, according to the Oxford Encyclopedia of the Islamic World, "this show of force demonstrated his intention to challenge the Byzantines for control of the northern part of the caravan route from Mecca to Syria".

See also
List of expeditions of Muhammad
Military career of Muhammad
Muhammad as a general
Hadith of position
Arabian Peninsula
Hejaz
Midian

References

630
7th century in the Byzantine Empire
Tabouk